Henry Wright was an early settler of Dedham, Massachusetts. As a member of the "second generation" of selectmen in Dedham, he served ten terms beginning in 1661.

When land was granted to Dedham settlers in compensation for the land given to Christian Indians in what is today Natick, Massachusetts, Wright's horse was hired to go survey the land.

References

Bibliography

Year of birth missing
Year of death missing
Dedham, Massachusetts selectmen
People from colonial Dedham, Massachusetts